Cyrille Watier (born 25 June 1972) is a French former professional footballer who played as a striker.

Watier was Stade Malherbe Caen's top goalscorer with 61 goals in all competitions between 1999 and 2005.

External links

1972 births
Living people
French footballers
Association football forwards
FC Lorient players
GSI Pontivy players
Stade Malherbe Caen players
En Avant Guingamp players
Stade Lavallois players
Ligue 1 players
Ligue 2 players